Perambra is a major town in Koyilandy taluk of Kozhikode district in North Malabar region of Kerala state, India. It is one of the 140 assembly constituencies in Kerala, and one of the 12 block Panchayats in Kozhikode district. Perambra lies almost at the centre of the district.

Block Panchayat

The block has a population of 1,71,433; (86,019 males and 85414 females). The Perambra block has seven panchayats: Changaroth, Cheruvannur, Kayanna, Koothali, Chakkittapara, Nochad and Perambra.

Transportation

Perambra town connects to other parts of India through Koyilandy, kozhikode and Vadakara. The nearest airports are at Kannur and Kozhikode.  The nearest railway station is at Koyiandy.  The national highway no.66 passes through Koyilandy and the northern stretch connects to Mangalore, Goa and Mumbai.  The southern stretch connects to Cochin and Trivandrum. The eastern National Highway No.54 going through Kuttiady connects to Mananthavady, Mysore and Bangalore.

Educational History 
The social reform movements, missionary work, drinking places, and service of the ground clerk are all factors that contribute to the educational activities of the Perambra block in the early stages. A board school was established in Perambra as a result of the activities of the Basel Mission. Groundbreaking schools, mosques and monastic schools existed in Cheruvannur, Nochat, Kayanna, Koothali, Changaroth and Perambra. Growing up in the traditional tradition of indigenous medicine, astrology, carpentry, veterinary medicine, music and dance, informal education contributed to social development. As colonial education began to proliferate, informal and traditional education became a setback. The activities of the Malabar District Board have expanded and formal educational institutions have emerged. The oldest school on the block was the Muipotpol ALP School, established in 1860 at Muipotpot in Cheruvannur. During the period when the caste system was rampant, the Pancham schools, which were set up for the Harijans in the villages of Perambra and Cheruvannur, did not work for many social reasons. The lower castes have been admitted to public schools as part of the agitations against the caste system and practices of untouchability. The schools started from 1944 in the settlement area of Chakkitapara.

There are 50 LP schools, 22 UP schools and 9 high schools in Block Panchayat. Established in 1975, CKGM Government College has facilities for undergraduate and postgraduate studies. Perambra High School has been upgraded from 1991 to Higher Secondary School.

History Of Perambra 

The area which was formerly known as Payyarmalanadu, eventually became Perambra. In the Northern Songs, there are references to the Paayyormalanadu of Old Kurumbranadu.

Notable People 

Noah Nirmal Tom - Athlete
Rajisha Vijayan - Actress

See also
 Kadiyangad
 Nadapuram
 Thottilpalam
 Madappally
 Villiappally
 Memunda
 Iringal
 Mahe, Pondicherry
 Payyoli
 Thikkodi
 Orkkatteri

References

External links 
 Official WebSite of Kozhikode
 Kozhikode District WebSite-Administration

Koyilandy area
Cities and towns in Kozhikode district